The 1984 National Rowing Championships was the 13th edition of the National Championships, held from 14–15 July 1984 at the National Water Sports Centre in Holme Pierrepont, Nottingham. The Championships were seriously affected by the fact that the Great Britain squad was in San Diego training for the 1984 Summer Olympics and the Junior squad was in Sweden for the World Championships.

Senior

Medal summary

Lightweight

Medal summary

Junior

Medal summary

Coastal

Medal summary 

Key

References 

British Rowing Championships
British Rowing Championships
British Rowing Championships